Peter John Smith (born February 27, 1966) is a former Major League Baseball starting pitcher, born in Abington, Massachusetts. He was drafted by the Philadelphia Phillies in the first round (21st overall pick) in the 1984 Major League Baseball draft. Smith was signed on June 14, 1984, to play in the Philadelphia Phillies organization. He batted and threw right-handed during his baseball career.

Early life
Smith graduated from Burlington High School in 1984 where he pitched two no-hitters in his senior year.

Career
The Philadelphia Phillies traded Smith to the Atlanta Braves, along with Ozzie Virgil, Jr., for Steve Bedrosian and Milt Thompson. Smith made his major league debut on September 8, 1987 with the Atlanta Braves at age 21. In , Smith pitched 3 shutouts, the season after his rookie year. The Atlanta Braves hoped Smith would develop into an ace pitcher as John Smoltz and Tom Glavine were developing to be. On a recent radio show, former Brave Mark Lemke said he thought Smith's down year could be attributed to injuries the pitcher hid from the team and media. He played the 1987 through  seasons with the Atlanta Braves before being traded to the New York Mets for Dave Gallagher. With the New York Mets, Smith only played the  season before being granted free agency on October 25 of that year. On December 1, 1994, Smith was signed as a free agent with the Cincinnati Reds. He played with the Cincinnati Reds for only half of the  season before being released on June 27, signing with the Florida Marlins on July 1. After spending the rest of 1995 in the minors, Smith became a free agent again, signing with the San Diego Padres on December 23.

Smith played  with San Diego's Class AAA farm club, the Las Vegas Stars, but returned to the majors in 1997, playing the next season and a half with the Padres. On May 31, 1997, Smith picked up his one and only MLB save during a Padres 12-5 victory over the Astros.  On June 9, 1998, Smith was traded to the Baltimore Orioles organization for minor leaguer Eric Estes. He played his final game on September 24, 1998. He earned a career ERA of 4.55, striking out 640 batters. Smith also pitched 4 shutouts throughout his major league career.

References

External links
 , or Baseball Almanac, or Sports Illustrated, or The Ultimate Mets Database

Major League Baseball pitchers
Atlanta Braves players
New York Mets players
Cincinnati Reds players
San Diego Padres players
Baltimore Orioles players
Baseball players from Massachusetts
1966 births
Living people
People from Abington, Massachusetts
People from Burlington, Massachusetts
Florida Complex League Phillies players
Clearwater Phillies players
Greenville Braves players
Macon Braves players
Richmond Braves players
Charlotte Knights players
Las Vegas Stars (baseball) players
Memphis Redbirds players
Sportspeople from Middlesex County, Massachusetts
Sportspeople from Plymouth County, Massachusetts